The cauda is a characteristic feature of songs in the conductus style of a cappella music.

Cauda may refer to:
 a tail-like protrusion of an aphid 
 Gavdos, once known as Cauda, a Greek island

See also

Caudal (disambiguation)